The Fauquier County Public Schools system (abbreviated FCPS) is a school division in the U.S. commonwealth of Virginia. It is a branch of the Fauquier County government which administers public schools in Fauquier County.

FCPS enrolls approximately 11,287 students in 20 schools (11 elementary schools, 5 middle schools, 3 high schools, 1 alternative learning school). The school board is currently led by Chairman Donna Grove, appointed in 2008. The school system finished with a graduation rate of 95.5% for the class of 2017.

High schools

Fauquier High School
Liberty High School
Southeastern Alternative School
Kettle Run High School
Mountain Vista Governor's School

Middle schools

Auburn Middle School
Cedar Lee Middle School
W. C. Taylor Middle School
Marshall Middle School
Warrenton Middle School

Elementary schools

C. M. Bradley Elementary School
James G. Brumfield Elementary School
W. G. Coleman Elementary School
Grace Miller Elementary School
H. M. Pearson Elementary School
C. Hunter Ritchie Elementary School
P. B. Smith Elementary School
Claude Thompson Elementary School
Mary Walter Elementary School
Greenville Elementary School
M. M. Pierce Elementary School

References

School divisions in Virginia
Education in Fauquier County, Virginia
Northern Virginia
1963 establishments in Virginia